Poritia phormedon is an Indomalayan butterfly endemic to Borneo that belongs to the lycaenids, the blues family. Poritia phormedon was described by Hamilton Herbert Druce in 1895.

References

Butterflies described in 1895
Poritia